Henry Wheeler may refer to:

Sir Henry Wheeler (governor) (1870–1950), governor of Bihar and Orissa
Sir Neil Wheeler (Henry Neil George Wheeler, 1917–2009), Royal Air Force officer
Henry Wheeler (cricketer) (1840–1908), English cricketer
Henry Wheeler (politician) (1861–1935), Australian politician
Henry Wheeler (signalman) (1925–2004), Royal Navy signalman
Henry Wheeler of Dr. Henry Wheeler House, Grand Forks, North Dakota
Henry Wheeler of Henry J. Wheeler Farm, Salt Lake Valley, Utah
, namesake of Wheeler County, Oregon

See also
Harry Wheeler (disambiguation)